Pichincha is a city in Pichincha Canton in the Manabí Province in Ecuador. It is situated along the Daule River.

References

Populated places in Manabí Province